Knollwood Village is a subdivision in Houston, Texas. It is managed by the Knollwood Village Civic Club (KVCC), which governs Knollwood Village sections 1-10 and Braes Terrace II.

History
The site that is currently Knollwood Village originally housed Main Street Airport. Flori Meeks of the Houston Chronicle stated that it was "dated at least to the early 1930s." According to David Fitts, who once served as the president of the KVCC, the first houses were built between 1951 and 1953. The airport closed in 1952. Fitts stated that the KVCC formed in 1953 and the constitution of the civic club was signed on June 18 of that year. Heather Saucier of the Houston Chronicle wrote that in the community, the rumor was that it was named after a knoll "because the area rarely flooded." Knollwood Village predates the 610 Loop and the Houston Astrodome. According to Meeks at the time Knollwood Village, "was in what was considered the outer boundaries of Houston."

In 2004 Katherine Feser wrote that "The neighborhood has gained in popularity among families because it is still relatively affordable."

In April 2010 the City of Houston "automated" curbside recycling program was extended to Knollwood Village.

By 2013 many older houses were being torn down and replaced with newer ones larger than the original ones. That year, Fitts stated that the buyers have become more varied, with some with children and some without children, and also "It's becoming a bit more multiethnic, which is good." On Saturday June 15, 2013, a birthday party for the subdivision, then 60 years old, was celebrated at the Linkwood Park Community Center. The party was planned by many individuals, including Fitts and Suzanne Jett; Jett stated that Houston City Council District K representative Larry Green and Donald Perkins, his chief of staff, helped plan the party.

Composition
Knollwood Village is inside the 610 Loop, in proximity to Reliant Park, south of South Braeswood and west of South Main.

Meeks stated that the subdivision is "shaped like a reversed L". The community has 11 sections. Ten are numbered 1-10, and one is called "Braes Terrace II".

The original houses are 1950s ranch-style houses. In 2004 most of them were one story houses with brick exteriors and cedar shakes. Many of them used hardwood as the material for the floors.

In 1998 the most expensive house in Knollwood Village was under $200,000 ($ when adjusted for inflation). In 2004 Feser stated "Today, the norm is well above that." Feser added that Knollwood Village was "still relatively affordable". In 2004 Flo Dean of Prudential Gary Greene, Realtors. Home stated that "They're still a lot less than going over into Braes Heights or Ayrshire or parts of Bellaire that are higher." In April 2017, the lowest and highest priced houses for sale were $370,000 and $725,000, with a median list price of $446,000.

According to an early flier for Knollwood Village, there were few trees in the community. By 2013 there were many trees.

In 2002 the City of Houston began installing an updated storm sewer system for the neighborhood because by that year, there was a tendency for the Brays Bayou to overflow and for rain to pool on lawns and streets. The $2.8 million project began in August 2002. By November of that year, was about 25-35% done according to Pat Henney, project manager for the company that manages the construction, Carter and Burgess Inc. It was scheduled to be completed in August 2003. In 2004 Feser wrote that the new streets and sewer system benefited the neighborhood.

Education
Residents are assigned to schools in the Houston Independent School District. They are zoned to Longfellow Elementary School, which is located in Braes Manor Section 1 in Braeswood Place, as well as Pershing Middle School in Braeswood Place, and Bellaire High School in the City of Bellaire. Any student zoned to Pershing may apply to Pin Oak Middle School's (in the city of Bellaire) regular program. In 2004 Feser wrote that International Baccalaureate and academic programs at schools like Pershing and Bellaire attracted homebuyers with children.

Infrastructure
Harris Health System (formerly Harris County Hospital District) designated Martin Luther King Health Center in southeast Houston for ZIP code 77025. The nearest public hospital is Ben Taub General Hospital in the Texas Medical Center.

Parks and recreation
Linkwood Park is in the area. Linkwood Park and Community Center is in Braes Manor Section 1 in Braeswood Place.

References

Further reading
 Foster, Robin. "Longtime friends trade two for one to upgrade living space." Houston Chronicle. May 26, 2009.

External links

 Knollwood Village

Neighborhoods in Houston